Donji Mihaljevec is a village in Croatia. It is connected by the D20 highway.

References

Populated places in Međimurje County